Mumbai 125 KM is a 2014 Indian  horror film directed by Hemant Madhukar and produced by Nishant Pitti from EaseMyTrip  and starring Karanvir Bohra, Vedita Pratap Singh whilst Veena Malik played the main antagonist.

Plot summary
Aashika wakes up frightened in a hospital and goes into a flashback. A group of friends Jacks, Prem, Diya and Vivek decides to travel to Mumbai to celebrate New Year's Day. While travelling, a patrolling cop halts the car and interrogates them on the account of driving under the influence of alcohol, to which Prem bribes him into letting them go. That night, they encounter weird situations and a baby cradle, which they avoid. Prem accidentally hits a car; while figuring out who they hit, they come across a man who warns them to back off or else they will all be killed. The friends try to take the man to the same cop they met before but find the cop brutally murdered. The man suddenly disappears.

The friends sense danger and find a way to get back off the road but the road seems to be endless. They encounter a girl and offer her a lift. The friends assume that she's a mental patient and try to take her to a hospital. Leaving to find the asylum in the jungle, they leave Jacks in the car with the girl. Jacks is murdered as well. Prem and Vivek later come out of their car and have an argument. Splitting ways, Vivek discovers an abandoned house where he gets brutally killed by the mysterious girl. Prem, Aashika and Diya are now the only survivors. Prem orders the girls to stick together but a scared Diya runs away and gets killed too. Scared, Prem and Aashika run and Prem ends up in a graveyard. He witnesses his deceased friends' souls and gets killed by the girl.

In the present, Aashika in the hospital finds out about the girl by a nurse. The girl's name is Poonam. She visits Poonam's house and witnesses Poonam's husband's and mother-in-law's souls. The mother in law explains that Poonam was eccentric and wanted a child. She argued with her now-dead husband for a child and her mental condition worsened after her delivery. The doctor advises Poonam's husband that she needs counselling. It is also revealed that the accident by Prem and his friends actually crashed Poonam's car and killed her, her husband and child. Poonam returns as a ghost and swears vengeance upon the friends for murdering her child. Aashika was only saved because she was pregnant with Prem's child so Poonam didn't hurt her. Aashika's parents calls her and reveal that her child is aborted. This angers Poonam and Poonam kills Aashika.

Cast
 Karanvir Bohra as Prem
 Veena Malik as Poonam
 Vije Bhatia as Vivek
 Vedita Pratap Singh as Aashika
 Aparnaa Bajpai as Diya
 Rajiv Anand as Poonam's husband

Production
The film was shot in 82 nights.
The film is shot entirely on Stereoscopic 3D cameras and released in 2D and 3D formats.

Box office
The film grossed ₹14.65 crores in India.

Critical reception
Rahul Desai from Mumbai Mirror gave 0.5 out of 5 claiming that film has been made with incompetent direction.
Bryan Durham from Daily News and Analysis gave 1 star rating out of 5 and stated "Mumbai 125 KM is a fine example why Indian filmmakers should keep away from thrashing the holy house of horror which is adorned by classics like The Excorcist, The Omen, The Conjuring and many more."
Shubha Shetty-Saha from Mid-Day gave 0.5 stars out of 5 stating film has unnecessary content and themes.
Radio Jockey Jeeturaj from Radio Mirchi gave 3 stars out of 5. In a review written for The Times of India, Renuka Vyavahare deemed Veena Malik's "show-stealer" character the biggest detriment to a film that "as a slasher, gets too monotonous and repetitive... old wine in an old bottle."

Soundtrack

The album's songs were Mani Sharma  performed by multiple singers including Zubeen Garg, Chitra Sivaraman, Shalmali Kholgade and others and lyrics were penned by Kumaar and Sravana Bhargavi.

References

External links

2010s Hindi-language films
Indian remakes of French films
Indian supernatural horror films
Indian 3D films
2014 3D films
2014 films
Indian films about revenge
Films set in Mumbai
Films shot in Mumbai
Indian slasher films
2014 horror films
2010s slasher films
Hindi-language horror films
Films directed by Hemant Madhukar